In enzymology, a corydaline synthase is an enzyme that catalyzes the chemical reaction

S-adenosyl-L-methionine + palmatine + 2 NADPH + H+  S-adenosyl-L-homocysteine + corydaline + 2 NADP+

The 4 substrates of this enzyme are S-adenosyl methionine, palmatine, NADPH, and H+, whereas its 3 products are S-adenosylhomocysteine, corydaline, and NADP+.

This enzyme belongs to the family of transferases, specifically those transferring one-carbon group methyltransferases.  The systematic name of this enzyme class is S-adenosyl-L-methionine:protoberberine 13-C-methyltransferase.

References

 

EC 2.1.1
NADPH-dependent enzymes
Enzymes of unknown structure